For Heaven's Sake is an American comic strip by Mike Morgan with a religious humor theme. It is syndicated by Creators Syndicate and debuted in September 1991.

References

External links
 For Heaven's Sake at Creators Syndicate
 For Heaven's Sake at gocomics.com

American comics
Christian comics
1991 comics debuts
Gag-a-day comics
Gag cartoon comics